Nasimi rayon is a settlement and raion of Baku, capital of Azerbaijan, named after Imadaddin Nasimi and formed on June 13, 1969.

The administrative territory of the Nasimi district, one of the central districts of Baku, is 10 km² and the population is 215,120 in the official registration. The raion is bordered from northeast by Narimanov raion, from the south by Sabail raion, from the west by Yasamal raion and from the north by Binagadi raion. The executive government of Nasimi rayon was founded in November 1991. The current head of the executive power is Nasib Mahamaliyev (since March 3, 2006).

The raion houses the ministries of Finance and Healthcare, State Committee on Standardization, Metrology and Patents, State Railway Department, State Energy Control Office, State Circus and some other institutions. Nasimi Municipality operates in the district. There are no settlements, villages, and other administrative territorial units in Nasimi district. There are 19 large industrial enterprises, 4 Scientific Research and Design Institutes, 13 banks and their branches, 9 communication enterprises, and 11 hotels. The largest enterprise according to the number of employees is "Baku Tikish Evi" OJSC. There are 8 secondary schools, 4 secondary and vocational schools, 8 secondary schools (Azerbaijan Oil Academy, Music Academy, Azerbaijan Medical University, Azerbaijan University of Languages, Azerbaijan Slavic University, Baku Asian University, Azerbaijan University, Baku Girls University) educational institution, 2 music schools, 47 nursery-kindergartens, 11 hospitals, 11 polyclinics, 13 architectural monuments.

2,457 families (10,872 persons) from Nagorno-Karabakh and other occupied territories have been temporarily settled in the region. There are 152 martyrs (138 of them were martyrs of war in Karabakh and 14 were otherwise martyred).

References

External links
 Executive Power of Nasimi raion  

1969 establishments in the Soviet Union
Districts of Baku